In enzymology, a D-lactate dehydrogenase (cytochrome) is an enzyme that catalyzes the chemical reaction

(D)-lactate + 2 ferricytochrome c  pyruvate + 2 ferrocytochrome c

Thus, the two substrates of this enzyme are (D)-lactate and ferricytochrome c, whereas its two products are pyruvate and ferrocytochrome c.

This enzyme belongs to the family of oxidoreductases, specifically those acting on the CH-OH group of donor with a cytochrome as acceptor. The systematic name of this enzyme class is (D)-lactate:ferricytochrome-c 2-oxidoreductase. Other names in common use include lactic acid dehydrogenase, D-lactate (cytochrome) dehydrogenase, cytochrome-dependent D-(−)-lactate dehydrogenase, D-lactate-cytochrome c reductase, and D-(−)-lactic cytochrome c reductase. This enzyme participates in pyruvate metabolism. It employs one cofactor, FAD. This type of enzyme has been characterized in animals, fungi, bacteria and recently in plants
. It is believed to be important in the detoxification of methylglyoxal through the glyoxylase pathway

References

 
 
 
 Boyer, P.D., Lardy, H. and Myrback, K. (Eds.), The Enzymes, 2nd ed., vol. 7, Academic Press, New York, 1963, p. 557-565.

EC 1.1.2
Flavoproteins
Enzymes of unknown structure